Ente Ponnu Thampuran is a 1992 Indian Malayalam film, directed by AT Abu, starring Suresh Gopi and Urvashi in the lead roles.

Plot
When Kavitha, a carefree young woman is forced by her father to get married to an IAS officer, she seeks helps from her tutor.

Cast
 Suresh Gopi as Thamburan/ Vinod
 Urvasi as Kavitha Bharathan Pilla	
 Jagathy Sreekumar	as Prabhulla Kumar
 Innocent	as Varkki Pathrose Thunjanparambil
 Rajan P Dev as S.I Idikulla	
 Siddique as Pattar	
 Mala Aravindan as Ravunni	
 Mamukkoya as Mammotty Master
 Paravoor Bharathan as Bharathan Pilla	
 Philomina as Meerabhayi
 Riza Bava as Sreekumar
 N. L. Balakrishnan as Fayalwan.Vikneswaran pilla 
 A. C. Zainuddin as Korahachen
 Thesni Khan
 Lalithasree
 Zainuddin (actor) as Principal Kunjikora M A
 Trichur Elsi
 Kuthiravattam Pappu as Constable

Soundtrack

All songs are composed by G. Devarajan and lyrics are written by Vayalar Sarath Chandra Varma. This is Vayalar Sarath Chandra Varma's debut film.

References

External links

1992 films
1990s Malayalam-language films
Films directed by A. T. Abu
Films scored by Mohan Sithara